Antonio Tosti (4 October 1776 – 20 March 1866) was Catholic Cardinal-Priest of San Pietro in Montorio in Rome and later Camerlengo of the Sacred College of Cardinals and Librarian of the Vatican Library.

Personal life
Tosti was born on 4 October 1776 in Rome, where he died on 20 March 1866.

Cardinal-Priest
Little else is known of Tosti's personal life and few official records exist prior to his elevation to Cardinal (in pectore) and appointment as Cardinal-Priest of San Pietro in Montorio on 18 February 1839 where he served until his death.

Official Vatican roles
In 1859 Tosti was appointed Camerlengo of the Sacred College of Cardinals (not to be confused with the role of Camerlengo of the Holy Roman Church).

Tosti resigned from this post in 1860 upon appointment as the Librarian of the Vatican Library, a title he held until his death in 1866.

See also
Catholic Church
College of Cardinals
Vatican

References

1776 births
1866 deaths
Camerlengos of the Holy Roman Church
19th-century Italian cardinals
Cardinals created by Pope Gregory XVI